The Austin Civitan Open was a golf tournament on the LPGA Tour, played only in 1962. It was played at the Austin Country Club in Austin, Texas. Sandra Haynie won the event. It was the first of forty-two career LPGA Tour wins.

References

Former LPGA Tour events
Golf in Texas
Sports in Austin, Texas
Women's sports in Texas
1962 establishments in Texas
1962 disestablishments in Texas